Kajghuneh (also Romanized as Kājghūneh and Kāzhghūneh) is a village in Rezqabad Rural District, in the Farah Dasht District of Kashmar County, Razavi Khorasan Province, Iran. At the 2006 census, its population was 271, in 80 families.

References 

Populated places in Kashmar County